Virginia Gardens is a village in Miami-Dade County, Florida, United States. According to the U.S. Census Bureau, the village had a population of 2,364 in 2020.

History 
In 1947, Miami Springs (of which it was then a part) passed an ordinance outlawing horses from the city limits. In response, about 50 citizens decided to break away and form their own village.

The village is named for the state of Virginia, original home of many of the wealthy transplants who made up the founding residents. Only a single  residential property remains within the village limits today; the bulk of residential property now consists of  lots typical of suburban developments.

Geography 
It is bordered to the north and east by the city of Miami Springs and to the south by Miami International Airport.

Demographics

2020 census

As of the 2020 United States census, there were 2,364 people, 781 households, and 508 families residing in the village.

2010 census

As of 2010, there were 949 households, of which 5.3% were vacant. In 2000, 31.7% had children under the age of 18 living with them, 47.3% were married couples living together, 14.9% had a female householder with no husband present, and 33.0% were non-families. 27.1% of all households were made up of individuals, and 7.9% had someone living alone who was 65 years of age or older. The average household size was 2.63 and the average family size was 3.22.

2000 census
In 2000, age distribution was 23.0% under the age of 18, 7.6% from 18 to 24, 31.9% from 25 to 44, 23.9% from 45 to 64, and 13.5% who were 65 years of age or older. The median age was 38 years. For every 100 females, there were 97.5 males. For every 100 females age 18 and over, there were 93.1 males.

In 2000, the median household income $40,197, and the median family income was $44,800. Males had a median income of $31,302 versus $26,274 for females. The per capita income for the village was $21,139. About 9.5% of families and 11.3% of the population were below the poverty line, including 16.3% of those under age 18 and 6.6% of those age 65 or over.

In 2000, speakers of Spanish as a first language made up 71.66%, and English as the main language accounted for 28.34% of the population.

Education 
Virginia Gardens is a part of Miami-Dade County Public Schools.
 Miami Springs High School serves Virginia Gardens.

Blessed Trinity Catholic School, a K–8 school of the Roman Catholic Archdiocese of Miami, is in Virginia Gardens.

References

External links
 

Villages in Miami-Dade County, Florida
Villages in Florida